Progress 4, was a Progress cargo spacecraft launched by the Soviet Union in 1978 to resupply the Salyut 6 space station. It used the Progress 7K-TG configuration and was the fourth Progress mission to Salyut 6. It carried supplies aboard Salyut 6, as well as equipment for conducting scientific research, and fuel for adjusting the station's orbit and performing manoeuvres.

Spacecraft
Progress 4 was a Progress 7K-TG spacecraft. The fourth of forty three to be launched, it had the serial number 105. The Progress 7K-TG spacecraft was the first generation Progress, derived from the Soyuz 7K-T and intended for uncrewed logistics missions to space stations in support of the Salyut programme. On some missions the spacecraft were also used to adjust the orbit of the space station.

The spacecraft were powered by chemical batteries, and could operate in free flight for up to three days, remaining docked to the station for up to thirty.

Launch
Progress 4 launched on 3 October 1978 at 23:09:30 UTC from the Baikonur Cosmodrome in the Kazakh Soviet Socialist Republic. It used a Soyuz-U rocket.

Docking
Progress 4 docked with Salyut 6 on 6 October 1978 at 01:00:15 UTC.

Decay
It remained in orbit until 26 October 1978, when it was deorbited. The deorbit burn occurred at 16:28 UTC.

See also

 1978 in spaceflight
 List of Progress missions
 List of uncrewed spaceflights to Salyut space stations

References

Progress (spacecraft) missions
1978 in the Soviet Union
Spacecraft launched in 1978
Spacecraft which reentered in 1978
Spacecraft launched by Soyuz-U rockets